Harbour  is a 2008 horror/drama novel written by John Ajvide Lindqvist about a cursed island called Domarö in the Stockholm archipelago.

Plot introduction
The story follows Anders whose young daughter goes missing one winter day. Several years later an alcoholic and divorced Anders returns to the island. The novel also follows Anders' stepfather on the island, the illusionist Simon, who is starting to notice that there is something strange with the island and the sea itself.

Author's device
John Ajvide Lindqvist has said that the one concept he wanted to use in his novel from the start was that of using two ghosts driving around on a moped and speaking in The Smiths quotes.

External links
The Guardian review

2008 Swedish novels
Swedish horror fiction
Novels by John Ajvide Lindqvist
Novels set in Sweden
Novels set on islands